Abacha  is a type of food originating with the Igbos in south eastern Nigeria.

Abacha is popular in the Eastern part of Nigeria. It is made using dried, shredded cassava. You can eat it as a snack or a full meal. Abacha is also called African Salad, it is a delicious west African food that is native to the ndi Igbo (people of Igbo) and it is usually prepared with palm oil, crayfish, ugba, etc.

Ingredients 
 Dried shredded cassava
 Ugba or ukpaka
 Palm oil
 Powdered potash
 Fish (spiced cooked)
 Ponmo (cooked and sliced)
 Onion (sliced)
 Garden eggs (Diced)
 Garden egg leaves (chopped)
 Salt and dry pepper
 Crayfish
 Seasoning cubes
 Calabash nutmeg
 Ogiri
 Fresh utazi leaves
 Boiling water

Preparations
1. Add the grated cassava (abacha) into a bowl of water , soak for 40 minutes and drain.

2. After cutting the utazi leaf, frying the fish and boil ponmo. Pour palm oil into a pot after mixing potash in warm water.

3. After a yellow paste is formed from mixing palm oil and potash, add spices like sliced onions, pepper, iru, ugba and garden eggs.

4. Serve and eat while hot.

References 

Igbo cuisine